Otomārs Aleksandrs Oškalns (12 April 1904 — 1 September 1947) was a prominent Latvian communist and partisan fighter.

He was one of three Latvian Soviet partisans who became Heroes of the Soviet Union.

Life 
Born in to the family of a farm laborer, in 1925 Oškalns received his teacher's exam.

In 1934 he was arrested for political activities after the Ulmanis Coup.

In 1939 he joined the Communist Party of Latvia, and in 1940 he became a member of the Supreme Soviet of the Latvian SSR. After Nazi Germany invaded Latvia in 1941, Oškalns was active as a leader of communist partisans. from April 30, 1942 he was commissar of the Latvian Soviet partisan detachment "For Soviet Latvia" ("Par Padomju Latviju"), which operated as part of the 2nd Leningrad Partisan Brigade. Later, he was the commander of the 3rd Latvian partisan brigade. Member of the Task Force of the Central Committee of the CPL (b).

In 1944, Oškalns became the first secretary of the Riga Regional Committee of the Communist Party of Latvia. After the war, In 1946 he became the Minister of Technical Cultures of the Latvian SSR and a deputy of the Supreme Soviet of the Soviet Union. 

He is buried in Riga.

Awards 
 Hero of the Soviet Union (1945)
 Order of Lenin
 Order of the Patriotic War II class
 medals

Memory 
Small bronze monument was erected in Jēkabpils after his death.

After his death, Riga's second largest railway station was named after him.

When Latvia became independent in 1991, Oškalns was viewed as a Soviet collaborator, and his name was stripped from the railway station. Monuments to him were also removed from public locations.

See also
Arturs Sproģis
Imants Sudmalis
Vasiliy Kononov
Communist Party of Latvia

Sources 
 Ошкалнс Отомар Петрович / сайт "Герои страны" (Russian)

Notes 

1904 births
1947 deaths
People from Cēsis Municipality
People from Kreis Wenden
Communist Party of Latvia politicians
People's commissars and ministers of the Latvian Soviet Socialist Republic
Deputies of the People's Saeima
Second convocation members of the Supreme Soviet of the Soviet Union
Soviet Army officers
Soviet Latvian partisans
Heroes of the Soviet Union
Recipients of the Order of Lenin